Pietro Manganelli (born 3 December 1993) is an Italian footballer who plays as a centre-back for Serie D club A.S.D. San Donato Tavarnelle.

Club career
Manganelli started his senior career at Italian fifth division (Serie D) club Monteriggioni, in the Province of Siena. In 2011, he joined hometown club Siena's reserve team. Manganelli left Siena in 2012 for Italian fourth division (ex–Serie C2) club Borgo-a-Buggiano, along with Andrea Pastore in temporary deals. In 2013, he signed for non-league side Colligiana.

In 2014, the player was signed by Serie A club Parma. Manganelli, along with Michele Bentoglio, Daniele Casiraghi, Tommaso Domini and Alessandro Luparini were loaned to Lega Pro (ex–Serie C) club Gubbio in temporary deals.

References

External links
 
 AIC profile (data by Football.it) 
 Pietro Manganelli at TuttoCampo

1993 births
Living people
Italian footballers
Association football defenders
Sportspeople from Siena
Footballers from Tuscany
A.C.N. Siena 1904 players
A.S.D. Olimpia Colligiana players
A.S. Gubbio 1910 players
Parma Calcio 1913 players
Taranto F.C. 1927 players
A.S.D. Jolly Montemurlo players
S.S. Teramo Calcio players
A.S. Pro Piacenza 1919 players
Scandicci Calcio players
Serie C players
Serie D players
Eccellenza players